Banwell Ochre Caves are a 12.46-hectare geological Site of Special Scientific Interest near the village of Banwell, North Somerset, notified in 1983.

There are five caves in total which contain the most extensive and accessible yellow ochre workings in the Mendip Hills. A wide variety of ochre types and iron hydroxides (limonites) can be examined in situ, and the evidence of their accumulation as residual ore-bodies associated with Ice Age (Pleistocene) sediments is clearly visible. The caves are also a nesting site for the Horseshoe bat a protected species.

The caves were first exploited for ochre mining in the 1930s and worked until 1948.

See also

 Banwell Caves
 Caves of the Mendip Hills

References

Caves of Somerset
Sites of Special Scientific Interest in Avon
Sites of Special Scientific Interest notified in 1983
Sites of Special Scientific Interest in Somerset
Limestone caves